Senator Beers may refer to:

Bob Beers (politician, born 1959), Nevada State Senate
George D. Beers (1812–1880), New York State Senate
Robert O. Beers (1916–2005), Pennsylvania State Senate